Alvin Peter "Pix" Pierson (1898 – 1974) was an American college football player and coach.  He served as the head football coach at Fresno State College—now known as California State University, Fresno—in 1945 and again in 1949, compiling a record of 7–14–2.

Early life
Pierson was born in 1898 in Carthage, South Dakota.  He family moved to Sacramento, California in 1901 and later Modesto and Turlock.  Pierson graduated from Turlock High School.

College
Pierson played tackle on the freshman squad for Pomona College in 1917. He suffered a severe concussion during a game against Pomona High School on October 13, 1917. Pierson played for coach Andy Smith's California Golden Bears football "wonder teams" of the early 1920s. He then played for the Nevada Wolfpack.

Coaching career

Florida
Pierson was an assistant for coaches Tom Sebring and Charlie Bachman for the Florida Gators of the University of Florida, part of the staff on its 1928 team.

Tampa
Pierson assisted fellow former Florida assistant Nash Higgins when he became head coach of the Tampa Spartans.

Fresno State
Pierson was hired as head coach of Fresno State.

Head coaching record

References

External links

1898 births
1974 deaths
American football guards
American football tackles
California Golden Bears football players
Coaches of American football from California
Colorado Mines Orediggers football coaches
Florida Gators football coaches
Fresno State Bulldogs football coaches
Fresno State Bulldogs men's basketball coaches
Nevada Wolf Pack football players
People from Miner County, South Dakota
People from Turlock, California
Players of American football from Sacramento, California
Sportspeople from Modesto, California
Tampa Spartans football coaches